Devoll may refer to

Devoll Municipality, in Korçë County, southeastern Albania
Devoll (river), in southern Albania

See also 
 Devol (disambiguation)
 Devol
 Devol Treaty